Vanguard was a gay rights youth organization active from 1965 to 1967 in San Francisco, California. The organization was dissolved due to internal clashes in late 1966 and early 1967. Vanguard magazine, originally and later loosely affiliated with the organization, continued the organization's spirit and was published through 1978 by Keith St. Clare.

History
In the fall of 1965, Adrian Ravarour and Billy Garrison founded Vanguard, an LGBT gay liberation youth organization in the Tenderloin neighbourhood of San Francisco, California. Joel Williams asked Ravarour as an educated adult and former priest to help the Tenderloin LGBT youth who had suffered discrimination. Seeing their conditions, Ravarour began organizing and asked the LGBT youth if they were willing to demonstrate for equal rights to end discrimination. Garrison thought this approach was dangerous, so they developed two proposals: Garrison proposed peaceful co-existence, and Ravarour proposed demonstrations for LGBT rights. Since Ravarour was a staff member of Intersection for the Arts, he asked its director Reverend Laird Sutton for the use of the venue. Sutton recalled that Ravarour asked about "using Intersection as a meeting place for a proposed new organization of LGBT youth of the Tenderloin ... I knew that the proposal which Adrian and Billy had while having great merit was not directly in keeping with the purpose of Intersection ... therefore I said no ... but urged them to take it to Glide." In Beyond the Possible, Janice Mirikitani confirmed that Sutton had sent the youth who started Vanguard at Glide Memorial Church.

Phyllis Lyon knew Ravarour from Intersection and provided Glide's community meeting room for the first meeting. Rev. Cecil Williams welcomed Ravarour and Garrison and offered the use of Glide as a venue for as long as needed. On the third meeting, Ravarour and Garrison presented their proposals to the LGBT youth, who chose Ravarour's plan. Ravarour named the group Vanguard and led their meetings throughout the fall of 1965 into spring 1966. To unify the group, Ravarour taught philosophical and historical principles of their rights to equality and the examples of Mahatma Gandhi, and Martin Luther King Jr. Decades later, Rev. Larry Mamiya recalled in his Memoir: 

During the first ten months of Vanguard, from fall 1965 to spring 1966, its prominent members were Juan Elorreaga, Dixie Russo, Billy Garrison, Joel Williams, and January Ferguson. Although not advised by Glide, Vanguard held its 1965 Thanksgiving and Christmas dinners in Glide's basement. These were attended by Glide minister Rev. Ed Hansen, who remembered his contact with Vanguard as minimal: "Rather than being 'assigned' to meet with Vanguard ... I don't remember how many times I met with Vanguard, except that it was certainly more than once and likely only a few times before I left to return to Claremont."
 
In spring 1966, Vanguard members picketed small businesses that refused to serve the LGBT youth. When others asked Vanguard to demonstrate for their causes, Ravarour insisted that Vanguard maintain its focus on LGBT rights. In May, Rev. Williams asked Ravarour to apply for the war on poverty grant but Ravarour declined and resigned as Vanguard's leader. Advertisements by Vanguard attracted J. P. Marat, who joined Vanguard and was elected president, becoming its firebrand spokesperson. On May 30, 1966, Hansen offered for Glide to sponsor Vanguard, which the membership voted to accept.

Glide's sponsorship began in June 1966. Mamiya was appointed Glide's first advisor to Vanguard, which was overseen by Ministers Louis Durham, Vaughn Smith, and Cecil Williams. Glide encouraged Vanguard to apply for non-profit status. Hansen began to attend meetings and assisted with the non-profit application, for which Marat was unanimously re-elected. Consultant Mark Forrester assisted it to apply for War on Poverty EOC funds, assisted by Joel Roberts.  Mamiya founded the weekend Vanguard Dances that attracted hundreds of LGBT people with DJ Mr. Friday. Despite this, Vanguard's membership experienced only small gains.

Mamiya witnessed numerous times that Ravarour was "called the founder of Vanguard by the DJ at the dances and JP and the kids."

In July, Roberts and Forrester organized major picketing of Compton's Cafeteria. On a morning in August, Russo—who headed Vanguard's street queen coalition—ordered coffee at the Doggie Diner. When refused service, Russo broke a sugar container. For the next five hours, 17 police in riot-gear surrounded Russo, Williams, Ravarour, and others. When the police withdrew, Ravarour felt as if new freedom had been won, and the trans community were emboldened. That night, when one of the Tenderloin street queens was insulted inside Compton's Cafeteria, the Compton's Cafeteria riot began.

Vanguard protested several times the following fall, but the last months of 1966 were problematic for the organization. Marat's activities as president lessened after his requests for a salary were denied. New member Keith St. Clare took over as editor of Vanguard magazine in November. Marat withdrew Vanguard from Glide, and Vanguard subsequently fell apart.

In January 1967, Vanguard was granted non-profit status and its incorporation papers arrived, so Glide attempted to revive the organization. However, a few months later, Vanguard magazine stated that Vanguard was dysfunctional and that the magazine no longer represented the defunct organization. Russo initially led some members to form the first Gay and Lesbian Center, which lasted until the 1980s. The war-on-poverty monies earmarked for Vanguard were used to fund Hospitality House.

Notes

References

See also
Gay liberation

Organizations based in San Francisco
1960s in LGBT history
Defunct LGBT organisations in the United Kingdom
1965 establishments in California